Palmer Williams (died January 1, 1996) was an American broadcast journalist and documentary film maker. He worked closely with Edward R. Murrow.

Williams with CBS
Williams spent most of his career at CBS News working in both radio and television. However, during World War II Williams spent time making documentaries including Frank Capra's Why We Fight; it was after the war that Williams joined CBS where he would become influential over talents such as Edward R. Murrow.

Williams played key roles in developing Hear It Now and its television counterpart See It Now, which the famed Murrow hosted. Later in his career he would go on to produce installments of CBS News and CBS Reports. His last years before his 1981 retirement were spent as a senior producer for 60 Minutes.

Williams in pop culture
Palmer Williams was portrayed by actor Thomas McCarthy (billed as Tom McCarthy) in the 2005 film Good Night, and Good Luck.

References
VHI Movies Bio

1996 deaths
American male journalists
American reporters and correspondents
Year of birth missing
60 Minutes producers